William Maxwell Wright (13 April 1901 – 10 February 1988) was an Australian rules footballer who played with Melbourne in the Victorian Football League (VFL).

Wright later played football with both Camberwell and Brighton in the Victorian Football Association (VFA).

Notes

External links 

Max Wright's playing statistics from The VFA Project

1901 births
1988 deaths
Australian rules footballers from Victoria (Australia)
Melbourne Football Club players
Camberwell Football Club players
Brighton Football Club players